Hugo Artemis Solon Saturnicus Reginald Arthur Rune is a fictional character appearing in several of Robert Rankin's novels, generally being portrayed as a kind of anti-hero, possessing a fundamentally good character with assorted eccentricities.

Rune's origins
Rune's exact origins and the circumstances of his childhood are unknown; while some sources suggest he has lived a relatively normal life span- such as him mentioning in The Witches of Chiswick, during an appearance he made in the Victorian era, that his father was in the brewery trade, although this was later confirmed to be false- Rune himself has been recorded as stating that he was actually the thirteenth disciple of Jesus Christ, who requested that his name be left out of the New Testament, and has subsequently walked the Earth ever since. He stated in The Brightonomicon that he comes of Highland stock, and that his ancestors include the Rankins, but this fails to establish further details about how he became the man he is today. Despite two separate books stating that Rune is recorded as having died, penniless, in a Hastings boarding house in his ninetieth year, Rune is generally portrayed as being more or less immortal, simply faking his death at irregular intervals in an attempt to escape his debts (although he was briefly killed by a shot to the head in The Brightonomicon, he was resurrected by Jesus Christ's last living descendant).

In the book Retromancer, he explains to his acolyte, Rizla, that the evil Count Otto Black, Rune's arch-enemy, had somehow persuaded angels to cut Black's name from the book that contained all the people who will ever live. As his name no longer appears in the book, it can no longer be crossed out, thus Black can never die. However, as pages have two sides, the person whose name was on the other side also does not appear, and thus is also immortal. That other person was Rune.

Physical appearance
Rune's physical appearance is the most obvious detail about him that makes him stand out from the crowd, being described as a large, bald man with a tattooed pentagram upon his head, of great weight and colossal hands, the fingers of which are covered with silver rings covered with occult symbols. His trademark clothing is a suit of green Boleskine tweed, brown size-twelve Oxford shoes, and several watches, giving him the appearance of someone from the 1930s while still leaving him with a great sense of charisma.

Personality
Personality-wise, Rune is best described as an eccentric genius, mainly due to his refusal to pay for anything from food to clothing; he argues that he offers the world his genius - which, to be fair to him, is indeed portrayed as being exceptional, if hard to follow at times-, and all he asks in exchange is that the world cover his expenses. He has also been shown to have a significant ego, causing him to often demand to see anything remotely related to him, and on one occasion even stated that he never disrobes in public for fear of inciting jealousy or lust from those around him rather than any sense of modesty. Despite his evident ego, Rune has been shown to be a very compassionate man in his way, mourning the deaths of his friends and generally genuinely driven by a desire to help the world. His intellect has led to him making extraordinary deductions and reaching equally remarkable conclusions about the world we live in, many of which fundamentally make no sense but, at the same time, are practically impossible to find fault with. For example, Rune has deduced that Earth's population is in decline due to one person requiring two parents, four grandparents, eight great-grandparents and so on simply for them to exist; the argument clearly cannot work, as Earth's population is constantly on the increase, but at the same time it is hard to find fault with his reasoning.

His other theories include the Small Screw Phenomena, whereby the appearance of two small screws whenever an electric device is taken apart and put back together is explained by the fact that screws breed inside electrical appliances. Spontaneously Generated Crowd Phenomena - crowd mentality is caused by spores that drift throughout Earth and form wherever a potentially crowd-causing situation occurs. The Mystery of the Biro - Biros are actually sentient creatures that hate their role in life and constantly seek to escape. The Forbidden Zones - the A-Z of London actually stands for 'Allocated Zones', referring to the zones where human beings are allowed to live, with other zones and the aforementioned 'Forbidden Zones' being used by the secret masters of the world.

Rune's accomplishments
Rune's list of apparent accomplishments is equally remarkable. If all available sources are to be believed, he has walked the earth as Nostradamus, Uther Pendragon (although he also reveals himself to have been Merlin), Count Cagliostro and Rodrigo Borgia, can open a tin of sardines with his teeth, strike a Swan Vesta on his chin (this is not much of an accomplishment as a Vesta is a strike-anywhere match), rope steers, drive a steam locomotive, hum all the works of Gilbert & Sullivan without becoming confused or breaking down in tears, was taught how to stop his heart by the Dalai Lama (in exchange for teaching him how to play darts), once climbed Mount Everest in a smoking jacket and plus-fours to win a bet with Oscar Wilde, swam the Atlantic Ocean to win a bet with Humphrey Bogart, reinvented the ocarina (thus giving it more holes and allowing it to open portals to the aforementioned 'Forbidden Zones'), an expert swordsman, a gourmet chef, a world traveler, poet, painter, stigmatist, guru to gurus and hater of Bud Abbott.

Rune has also claimed the personal friendship of many well-known figures in history and society as a whole, his list including the likes of H.G. Wells/Arthur Conan Doyle (portrayed as the same person, with Wells being the 'real' identity due to an elaborate bet in university getting out of hand), Charles Babbage, Mohandas Karamchand Gandhi, Sigmund Freud (a conversation with Freud actually resulting in the Sultan of Brunei acquiring his wealth when Rune attempted to prove that one of the really wonderful things in this world is to be in the right place at the right time), Pope Pius XII (allegedly Rune was responsible for him joining the priesthood; he was originally interested in football, but he had a weak left foot), George Orwell (although Orwell was a member of the secret society who knew about the Forbidden Zones and hence was not entirely trustworthy), Albert Einstein (he claims to have taught Einstein everything he knew, but adds that Einstein made it all out to be more complicated than it really is to make himself appear smarter), Salvador Dalí, Ernest Hemingway, and many others. He is also known as a detective, having been recorded as working with Sherlock Holmes on at least one occasion- although he implies that there were other collaborations- and demonstrating some significant prowess at solving mysteries in The Brightonomicon and Retromancer (although many of these cases were solved thanks to Rune's knowledge of secret facts about the world that only he is truly aware of).

Magical powers and abilities 
Throughout the novels Hugo Rune claims that he has a great many magical powers, referring to himself as a wizard in The Witches of Chiswick.  Some of his powers may be cunning tricks or outright fraud.  Others, he has demonstrated effectively as a sign of his power or to get out of a tricky situation.

Invisibility - Rune claimed to have the power to turn himself invisible and H. G. Wells claimed that he demonstrated this ability before him and several friends at dinner.  Wells was impressed by how Rune appeared to fade from view, and stated that his used this as inspiration for his novel The Invisible Man.  A rival and critic of Rune who was also at the dinner gave a slightly different account “I was expecting some trickery from Rune and was on my guard.  So when he gestured wildly shouting ‘look it’s Humphrey Bogart!’ I was the only one not to look away and saw him dive under the table.  I attempted to expose his fraud by kicking him with by shoe, only for him to bite my leg!”  A court case followed.

With these two contradictory accounts, Hugo Rune himself was asked to explain to the court and the judge exactly what had occurred.  He claimed that he had in fact vanished, but also moved out of phase with the Earth itself, and so as it rotated he found himself sinking through the floor.  In a desperate attempt to anchor himself he grabbed hold of a convenient leg with his teeth, pulling him back to reality.  The judge and jury were not convinced and Rune was sentenced to prison.  However, when his cell was opened it was found to be empty save for a note that read “They seek him there, they seek him here.  Is he in heaven or on the moon, that disappearing Hugo Rune?”

Illusion magic – Rune was able to create a convincing illusion spell of himself and Inspectre Hovis being gunned down outside the Wife's Legs Café, fooling their enemies that they had been killed.

Jinx – He was able to place a powerful jinx on the phantom driver Norris Striver, who was doomed to drive around Lewes in his morris minor.  Anyone who accepted his offer of a lift was doomed to join him in eternal drive around the Lewes one-way system, and Rune's assistant Rizla had foolishly done so.  Rune's jinx caused the car to suffer a puncture, and as Norris was unable to leave the car himself he was forced to allow Rizla to leave so that he might change the tire.  Despite promising he would, Rizla took the opportunity to escape, for which Norris cursed him so that he was unable to find his way out of Lewes.  Rune was able to lift this curse as well by telling Rizla to walk backwards with his eyes closed.  This proved effective, though Rune did allow his young assistant to bump into a lot of bollards and lampposts.

Time travel – done with the aide of Barry the Time spout.  Also apparently done without as in Raiders of the Lost Car Park.  He was able to dine with Cornelius and Tuppe in an elegant manor house, but when the boys returned ten minutes later, they found the house in ruins and it appeared to have been abandoned and derelict for over fifty years.

Transfiguration - Able to cause Tuppe's mouth to disappear with a wave of hand and threatened to place it ‘in a location that ensures you never speak in public again’ if Tuppe did not stop interrupting his story.

The Microcosm - Rune had obtained the Microcosm device, a unique item built into a small table top that would take the form of any room it was placed in, complete with all the people.  This could be very useful, as anything done to the replica person is the Microcosm would also affect their counterpart in the real world – As above, so below.  Rune tells a story of a pitiless thief called Breeze who broke into a manor house of an ancient old man, believing ‘him to be fair game’.  But every room of the house was empty, stripped of furnishings and carpet, until the thief came to the central room and found the old man standing by a table.  The ancient explained that he knew who Breeze was, and invited him to inspect the device on the table – the Microcosm.  It showed the room they were standing in, complete with perfect replicas of the old man and the thief and even a table with a smaller Microcosm upon it.  The ancient explained how it had been his life's work to create the device and that it has cost him everything, but that the Microcosm was very valuable and all Breeze needed to do was to strike him down and it would be his.  The thief did so without a second's hesitation, hitting the old man with his crowbar.

But now he had a problem – the device now showed the old man dead at his feet and his own figure standing over the body.  This would be damning evidence and make it impossible for Breeze to sell the Microcosm.  But the solution came to him... all he need do was reach into the box and remove his own figure from the scene.  He did so, crushing its head as he did.

As above, so below.

The police found his body the next morning.  They said it looked as if a giant hand had reached out from above and ground him into bits.

Known relatives
Throughout the books, Rune has been recorded as having at least two children - Cornelius Murphy, the hero of the Cornelius Murphy Trilogy, who rescues Rune from the 'Forbidden Zones' and helps to defeat the secret rulers of the world, and the Campbell, the villain in The Book of Ultimate Truths and the grandson of the secret king of the world, who was conceived as a result of Rune's attempts to become a prince only for him to be killed at the conclusion of the novel - although his active sexual lifestyle would suggest the possibility that there are other children out there. In The Witches of Chiswick he summoned his descendants from the 25th century, Will Starling and Tim McGregor, into the Victorian Age, but exactly how they are related to Rune was never expressly stated.

The fate of Rune's parents and other immediate ancestors and siblings, if he has any, are unknown; the only even vague references to his upbringing to date include his comment that his father was in the brewery trade, and even that was later proven to be false, and another claim that he comes from a Highlander background with his ancestors among the Rankins (which, while still questionable, is slightly more plausible when Rankin's decision to set Biblical events in Britain is taken into account). In The Most Amazing Man Who Ever Lived, having learned the secret of perpetual reincarnation- allowing himself to be reborn over and over again on his original birth date, retaining all his memories of his previous life-, Rune arranged for his soul to be reborn as quintuplets, thus giving himself four identical brothers. Unfortunately, these four brothers all went evil, masterminding a plot to destroy all but a small percentage of the human race before they were defeated by Cornelius Murphy, leaving only the original Rune (who had long since abandoned his other selves in pursuit of matters that would benefit mankind as a whole).

List of appearances
To date, Rune has appeared in the following novels:
The Book of Ultimate Truths (Primarily behind the scenes)
Raiders of the Lost Car Park
The Most Amazing Man Who Ever Lived (Most of Rune's appearances here were that of his evil twins)
The Sprouts of Wrath (Only a partial role at the conclusion of the novel)
The Witches of Chiswick (Fakes his own death in the early part of the novel; the plot is thus dominated by his descendants, half-brothers Will Starling and Tim McGregor, both aided by Barry the Time Sprout)
The Brightonomicon (Accompanied by an amnesic Jim Pooley of The Brentford Trilogy, whose name the character- going by the alias of Rizla, Rune's acolyte, for most of the novel- only recalls at the conclusion of the novel)
Retromancer (Once again accompanied by Jim Pooley as Rizla; this novel apparently culminates in Rune's death when Rizla tricks Count Otto Black into falling into the Bottomless Pit to Hell, Rune thus aging and dying as it is now impossible for Black to come back, this 'severing' their pre-existing connection).

External links
 The Hugo Rune Homepage

Fictional characters who use magic
Fictional private investigators